Jairo Jose Díaz Hernandaz (born May 27, 1991) is a Venezuelan professional baseball pitcher who is a free agent. He made his Major League Baseball (MLB) debut with the Los Angeles Angels of Anaheim in 2014 and also played for the Colorado Rockies from 2015 to 2020, missing 2016 due to Tommy John surgery.

Career

Los Angeles Angels of Anaheim
In 2014, Diaz played for the Inland Empire 66ers of the Class A-Advanced California League and the Arkansas Travelers of the Class AA Texas League, and pitched to a 3.48 earned run average (ERA) with 85 strikeouts in  innings pitched. The Angels promoted him to the major leagues on September 8. Díaz made his MLB debut that day, recording two strikeouts.

Colorado Rockies
After the 2014 season, the Angels traded Díaz to the Colorado Rockies in exchange for Josh Rutledge. During the 2015 season, Díaz had a 3–5 record and a 4.58 ERA with 50 strikeouts in 47 appearances for the Albuquerque Isotopes of the Class AAA Pacific Coast League and a 2.37 ERA with 18 strikeouts in 21 appearances with the Rockies. During spring training in 2016, Díaz tore a ligament in his right elbow that would require Tommy John surgery. Díaz was designated for assignment on June 10, 2018, and later released on June 14. A day later, he re-signed with the Rockies to a minor league contract. He elected free agency on November 3, 2018. On December 21, Díaz re-signed to a minor league contract. He was called up on May 22, 2019, to the MLB roster. He would remain in the bullpen for the Rockies for the remainder of the season, posting a record of 6–4 in 56 games with 5 saves. In 2020, his performance regressed as he finished with a 7.65 ERA in 24 games with 4 saves. His control also worsened as he induced 14 walks in 20 innings. On April 1, 2021, Díaz was designated for assignment following the signing of Jhoulys Chacín. On April 5, Díaz was outrighted to the alternate training site.
Díaz spent the 2021 season with Triple-A Albuquerque. There, he made 9 appearances and struggled to a 7.36 ERA with 10 strikeouts. On October 5, Díaz elected free agency.

Gastonia Honey Hunters
On April 6, 2022, Díaz signed a minor league contract with the Seattle Mariners. On June 7, it was announced that Díaz's deal with the Mariners had never been finalized, and that he was signing with an independent team.

On June 7, 2022, Díaz signed with the Gastonia Honey Hunters of the Atlantic League of Professional Baseball. He appeared in 4 games, going 0–1 with a 5.40 ERA and 1 strikeout in 3.1 innings pitched. He was released by the team on July 19.

See also
 List of Major League Baseball players from Venezuela

References

External  links

1991 births
Living people
Arkansas Travelers players
Albuquerque Isotopes players
Arizona League Angels players
Boise Hawks players
Burlington Bees players
Caribes de Anzoátegui players
Cedar Rapids Kernels players
Colorado Rockies players
Dominican Summer League Angels players
Gastonia Honey Hunters players
Inland Empire 66ers of San Bernardino players
Lancaster JetHawks players
Los Angeles Angels players
Major League Baseball pitchers
Major League Baseball players from Venezuela
Orem Owlz players
People from Puerto la Cruz
Venezuelan expatriate baseball players in the United States
Venezuelan expatriate baseball players in the Dominican Republic